Kieran Goss is a South African rugby union player, currently playing with English National League 2 South team Chinnor. His position is fly-half or full-back.

Career
He started off playing for the  U18s at the SA Academy Week, which earned him a call-up to the South Africa Academy team for the 2009 Craven Week tournament.

In that season, he made 10 appearances for the Sharks' U19 team, scoring 4 tries. He was included in the  2011 Vodacom Cup squad, but failed to make an appearance. In the 2011 Under-21 Provincial Championship competition, he made 6 appearances, scoring 5 tries.

He made his first class debut for them against Argentine team , making six appearances in total in that competition and scoring one try. For the rest of the season, he reverted to the Under–21 team which won the 2012 Under-21 Provincial Championship.

He wasn't included in the squad in 2013 and signed a deal to join Cornish Pirates for 2013–14.  In November 2015, Goss joined National League 2 South side Chinnor on loan, before joining the team on a full-time basis prior to the 2016–17 season.

References

South African rugby union players
Eastern Province Elephants players
Cornish Pirates players
Living people
1991 births
Alumni of Wynberg Boys' High School
Rugby union fullbacks
Rugby union players from the Western Cape